Slovenly may refer to:
 Slovenly (band), an American post-punk band
 Slovenly (health), the characteristic of a person who neglects health-preserving practices
 Slovenly (penmanship), the characteristic of a graph that includes shape space around an idealized allograph